Susan River can refer to:

Australia 

 Susan River, Queensland, a locality in the Fraser Coast Region
 Susan River (Queensland), a river in Queensland, Australia

Canada 

Susan River (Labrador), a river in Labrador, Canada

United States 

Susan River (California), a river in California, United States